Ann Elizabeth Haddon "Nancy" Heath Bell (May 26, 1924 – November 29, 1989) was a Canadian senator.

She was appointed to the Senate of Canada by Prime Minister Pierre Trudeau in 1970 and sat as a Liberal representing Nanaimo-Malaspina, British Columbia. Independently minded, she did not believe in party discipline and often voted against legislation proposed by the Liberal government. She was a supporter of the monarchy and opposed the renaming of Dominion Day to Canada Day.

In 1985, Bell left the Liberal Party to sit as an Independent Senator. Bell died in 1989 while still in office.

References

External links
 

1924 births
1989 deaths
Canadian monarchists
Canadian senators from British Columbia
Women members of the Senate of Canada
Independent Canadian senators
Liberal Party of Canada senators
Politicians from Ottawa
Women in British Columbia politics
20th-century Canadian women politicians
Place of death missing